Andre Jerome McFarlane (born 1 November 1989) is a Caymanian footballer who plays as a  defender. He has represented the Cayman Islands during a World Cup qualifying match in 2011.

References

External links
 Tivoli's McFarlane Is CHEC Star Baller

Association football defenders
Living people
1989 births
Caymanian footballers
Cayman Islands international footballers
Future SC players
National Premier League players